The teams competing in Group 10 of the 2004 UEFA European Under-21 Championships qualifying competition were Republic of Ireland, Russia, Switzerland, Georgia and Albania.

Standings

* Match originally ended as a 2–1 win for Republic of Ireland, but UEFA later awarded the match as a 3–0 forfeit win to Albania due to Ireland including suspended player in their squad.

Matches
All times are CET.

Match originally ended as a 2–1 win for Republic of Ireland, but UEFA later awarded the match as a 3–0 forfeit win to Albania due to Ireland including suspended player in their squad.

Goalscorers
4 goals

 Vladimir Akhalaia
 Spartak Gogniyev

3 goals

 Roman Pavlyuchenko
 André Muff

2 goals

 Parid Xhihani
 Graham Barrett
 Jonathan Walters
 Alain Nef
 Johan Vonlanthen

1 goal

 Denis Boshnjaku
 Edmond Kapllani
 Bledar Mançaku
 Gjergji Muzaka
 Erjon Rizvanolli
 Aleksandr Amisulashvili
 Revazi Gotsiridze
 David Siradze
 Colin Cryan
 Wes Hoolahan
 Noel Hunt
 Liam Miller
 Andrei Arshavin
 Anton Bober
 Alan Kusov
 Dmitri Sychev
 Oleg Trifonov
 Sergei Vinogradov
 Pascal Cerrone
 Daniel Gygax
 Alain Rochat
 Nenad Savić
 Marco Streller

1 own goal
 Klaudjo Makaj (playing against Russia)

External links
 Group 10 at UEFA.com

Group Z
Under
Under
Under